Margaret Louise Furey is a New Zealand archaeologist. Formerly a consulting archaeologist, she is now Curator of Archaeology at Auckland War Memorial Museum.

Biography 
Furey completed her BA and MA at University of Auckland in anthropology (archaeology). In 2005 she was awarded a Doctor of Science by the university for her research in archaeological science (the first and only time that this qualification has been awarded to an archaeologist by the university).

Research 
Furey's research interests are around Māori material culture, and she is also interested in traditional Māori gardening and the sites and material culture of the first 200 years after Polynesians arrived in Aotearoa.

Furey has three current research projects. One focusses on early Māori ornaments held in museums and private collections in New Zealand. The second is Ahuahu Great Mercury Island Archaeology Project, a partnership between Auckland War Memorial Museum and University of Auckland. The last is a Royal Society Te Apārangi Marsden grant funded project "accurately dating the Māori past using marine shells".

Selected publications 
 Furey, L. (2015). Clay – a lesser known medium for Māori artefacts. Records of the Auckland Museum. Volume 50.
 Furey, L. (2014). Adzes with Notches. Records of the Auckland Museum, 49: 5–13.
 Furey, L. (2006). Māori gardening: An archaeological perspective. Department of Conservation.
 Furey, L., Sutton, D. & Marshall, Y. (2003). The Archaeology of Pouerua. Auckland University Press.
 Furey, L. (2002). Houhora. A Fourteenth Century Māori Village in Northland. Bulletin of the Auckland Museum, 19.

References 

Year of birth missing (living people)
Living people
New Zealand curators
New Zealand archaeologists
University of Auckland alumni
New Zealand women archaeologists
People associated with the Auckland War Memorial Museum
New Zealand women curators